Don Campbell (born 16 February 1975) is a Caymanian former cyclist. He competed in two events at the 1992 Summer Olympics.

References

External links
 

1975 births
Living people
Caymanian male cyclists
Olympic cyclists of the Cayman Islands
Cyclists at the 1992 Summer Olympics
Place of birth missing (living people)